Ooni Lagunja was the 25th Ooni of Ife, a paramount traditional ruler of Ile Ife, the ancestral home of the Yorubas. He succeeded Ooni Ojelokunbirin and was succeeded by  
Ooni Larunnka.

References

Oonis of Ife
Yoruba history